Events from the year 1944 in Sweden

Incumbents
 Monarch – Gustaf V
 Prime Minister – Per Albin Hansson

Events

 30 January – Swedish Confederation of Professional Employees is founded.

Births

 17 January – Jan Guillou, author
 7 June – Erling Wicklund, Swedish-Norwegian trombonist, composer, and journalist

Deaths

 5 July – Torine Torines, mechanic (born 1876) 
 14 July – Emil Fjellström, actor (born 1884)
 8 October – Elsa Lindberg-Dovlette, writer and princess of Persia (born 1874)

References

 
Years of the 20th century in Sweden
Sweden